The 2005–06 UCI Asia Tour was the second season of the UCI Asia Tour. The season began on 28 September 2005 with the Tour of Milad du Nour and ended on 16 September 2006 with the 2006 Asian Cycling Championships.

The points leader, based on the cumulative results of previous races, wears the UCI Asia Tour cycling jersey. Andrey Mizurov from Kazakhstan was the defending champion of the 2005 UCI Asia Tour. Ghader Mizbani of Iran was crowned as the 2005–06 UCI Asia Tour champion.

Throughout the season, points are awarded to the top finishers of stages within stage races and the final general classification standings of each of the stages races and one-day events. The quality and complexity of a race also determines how many points are awarded to the top finishers, the higher the UCI rating of a race, the more points are awarded.

The UCI ratings from highest to lowest are as follows:
 Multi-day events: 2.HC, 2.1 and 2.2
 One-day events: 1.HC, 1.1 and 1.2

Events

2005

2006

Final standings

Individual classification

Team classification

Nation classification

External links
 

UCI Asia Tour
2006 in road cycling
2005 in road cycling
UCI
UCI